The Państwowe Zakłady Inżynierii (National Engineering Works, PZInż) was a Polish pre-World War II arms industry holding and the main Polish manufacturer of vehicles, both military and civilian.

History 

It was created by the Polish minister of industry Eugeniusz Kwiatkowski on 19 March 1928 from several previously-existing state-owned factories and scientific institutes, among them the Centralne Warsztaty Samochodowe and the Ursus factory. It was Kwiatkowski's plan of reorganization and modernization of Polish arms industry that eventually led to the creation of PZInż, but also the Państwowe Wytwórnie Uzbrojenia (National Arms Works), Państwowe Zakłady Lotnicze (modern PZL), Państwowe Zakłady Optyczne (National Optical Works) and National Factory of Gunpowder and Explosives in Pionki.

Production
On 21 September 1932 the National Engineering Works signed a license agreement with Italian automobile manufacturer Fiat. Soon afterwards, assembly and production of Fiat 508 began. Until September 1939, some 10,000 models were produced in Warsaw’s Factory of Passenger and Light Commercial Vehicles (Fabryka Samochodow Osobowych i Polciezarowych).

In 1933, the PZInz was restructured, and divided into the following units:
 main office and technical office in Warsaw,
 Ursus Truck Factory,
 Factory of Passenger and Light Commercial Vehicles (also Polski Fiat Factory later FSO) in Warsaw,
 Engine and Equipment Plant in Warsaw,
 Ursus Foundry, in Ursus, Warsaw,
 Modlin Shipyard, which produced ORP Rybitwa and ORP Czajka,
 Service Station in Warsaw.

Among vehicles produced by the National Engineering Works, are such models, as:
 artillery tractors: C2P, C4P, C7P
 passenger cars: Fiat 508, Fiat 518, Fiat 524, PZInz L-S
 trucks: Fiat 618, Fiat 621, Ursus Typ A
 light tank 7TP (pictured)
 all terrain vehicles and tractors Fiat 621 C4P, PZIn˝ 222, PZIn˝ 703
 Sokol motorcycles 
 autobus Zawrat
 armored cars, Ursus wz.29, Ursus wz.34.

As well as vehicles PZInż also produced aero-engines under licence to various foreign manufacturers, such as:
 P.Z. Inż. Junior 120 hp  - Walter Junior from Czechoslovakia
 P.Z. Inż. Major - Walter Major from Czechoslovakia
 P.Z. Inż. Minor - Walter Minor from Czechoslovakia

The National Engineering Works also had several prototypes, which did not enter production due to invasion of Poland by Nazi Germany and the Soviet Union.

Shortly after the outbreak of World War II and the German occupation of Poland, the PZInż was confiscated by the German state, its factories dismantled and sent to Germany while a large part of the engineers were either killed or sent to Germany as slave workers. After the Warsaw Uprising the Warsaw headquarters of the PZInż was blown up, not to be rebuilt after the war. In 1946 the Ursus works started to be rebuilt and eventually became a large tractor factory.

See also 
 CWS T-1
 Ursus Factory

References 

Motor vehicle manufacturers of Poland
Defence companies of Poland
Car manufacturers of Poland
Defunct manufacturing companies of Poland
Manufacturing companies based in Warsaw